Elmer "Archie" Fowler Stone (January 22, 1887 – May 20, 1936) was a United States naval aviator and a commander in the United States Coast Guard.

Biography
Stone was born in Livonia, New York and grew up in Norfolk, Virginia. He joined the U.S. Revenue Cutter Service as a cadet at the Revenue Cutter Service School of Instruction on April 28, 1910.

Elmer Stone was a United States Coast Guard aviation pioneer; in early 1915 Stone and another officer Norman B. Hall, were the first to suggest that the Coast Guard develop an aviation capability. During the summer of 1915, Stone and Hall performed scouting patrols for Onondaga, assisting in search missions that the cutter was assigned. On March 28, 1916, he was assigned as a student aviator at the United States Navy flight facility in Pensacola, Florida. The same year he also studied aeronautical engineering at the Curtiss factory. On April 10, 1917, Stone became the Coast Guard's first aviator upon graduating from flight training at Pensacola and was appointed as Coast Guard Aviator No. 1 and Naval Aviator No. 38. On October 12, 1917, Stone was assigned to the U.S. Navy Aeronautic Station at Rockaway, New York.

In May 1919 First Lieutenant Elmer F. Stone was one of the two pilots, along with Walter Hinton, on the first successful transatlantic flight on NC-4 with Lieutenant Commander Albert C. Read, USN, as the mission commander and navigator. After the historic flight, he was made a knight of the Order of the Tower and Sword by the Portuguese government (June 3, 1919), awarded the British Air Force Cross by the British government (June 9, 1919) and received a promotion to the temporary rank of captain on September 25, 1919. He was awarded the Navy Cross and Congressional Medal of Achievement for "distinguished service in making the first successful trans-Atlantic flight" on November 11, 1920.

He continued to promote aviation in the U.S. Coast Guard during the 1920s,  He collaborated with the Curtiss Aeroplane and Motor Company on development of airborne "motor lifeboats" for the explicit purpose of lifesaving missions, and in this is one of the pioneers of modern air-sea rescue. He also commanded a former destroyer that was turned over to the U.S. Coast Guard and used in the enforcement of Prohibition.

After a tour at sea, Stone became the commanding officer of the Coast Guard Aviation Unit at Cape May, New Jersey, where he continued to develop his skill at making open-ocean landings. On April 5, 1933, Stone put his open-ocean landing skills to the test when the Navy dirigible Akron went down off the Atlantic coast in a storm with only three survivors of the 76 aboard, Stone was the only pilot available willing to attempt a landing in the heavy seas. He accomplished this successfully, but was too late to save any more lives. On December 20, 1934, he broke the world seaplane speed record, 191 miles per hour over a 3 kilometer test course.

Commander Stone's last duty was as the commanding officer of the Air Patrol Detachment in San Diego.

He died of a heart attack while on duty on May 20, 1936, in San Diego, California, while inspecting a new aircraft and was buried in Arlington National Cemetery.

Legacy
Commander Elmer "Archie" Stone was inducted into the United States Naval Aviation Hall of Honor on May 5, 1983, and is also a member of the U.S. Coast Guard Aviation Hall of Fame. Stone was a pivotal figure in the establishment and development of aviation for the Coast Guard and the Navy and was a favorite of many of the famous aviation figures of the day, including Eddie Rickenbacker, aircraft designers Anthony Fokker, Igor Sikorsky, and Alexander P. de Seversky.

The ninth Legend-class National Security cutter USCGC Stone is named in honor of Commander Stone.

Notes
Citations

References used

External links

 U.S. Coast Guard web site - Aviation History index
 Chronology of Coast Guard Aviation history
 

1887 births
1936 deaths
Aviators from New York (state)
United States Coast Guard Aviation
United States Coast Guard officers
United States Naval Aviators
Recipients of the Air Force Cross (United Kingdom)
Recipients of the Navy Cross (United States)
Recipients of the Order of the Tower and Sword
Congressional Gold Medal recipients
Burials at Arlington National Cemetery
American aviation record holders